Agapanthia pilicornis is a species of beetle in the family Cerambycidae. It was described by Johan Christian Fabricius in 1787.

References

pilicornis
Beetles described in 1787